Asif Ghafoor  (Urdu: آصِف غفور ) is a Lieutenant General in the Pakistan Army. Currently serving as Quetta Corps Commander, he was previously appointed as Inspector General for Communication & Information Technology. He was the 20th Director General of the ISPR

Education 
Ghafoor is a graduate of the Command & Staff College in Quetta, Command & Staff College Bandung in Indonesia and the National Defence University in Islamabad. He holds a master's degree in Strategic Studies.

Military life 
He was commissioned on 9 September 1988 in the 87 SP Medium Regiment Artillery after four years of training (1984-1988) as a Cadet in the Junior Cadet Battalion at PMA Kakul (1986–88). He had participated in the Kargil War as a Major, operations against terrorists in tribal areas of FATA and Swat during 2008-10 as a Lieutenant Colonel and has commanded a Division at Swat, Malakand in 2016 as a Major General. Asif has also served as Director Military Operations at Army Headquarters GHQ as a Brigadier commanded Divisional Artillery deployed along the Line of Control and infantry brigade along eastern border. He has been on faculty of Command and Staff College Quetta.

The General has served on various staff, instructional and command assignments including Brigade Major Infantry Brigade, Assistant Military Secretary MS Branch, GSO-I Military Operations Directorate, GHQ, Director Military Operations in Military Operations Directorate, GHQ. He has been on the faculty of Command and Staff College, Quetta. He has commanded his parent unit in Operation al-Mizan, Artillery Brigade on Line of Control, Infantry Brigade on Eastern Border and a Division at Swat, Malakand. The General is recipient of COAS Commendation Card for operations in Bajaur during 2008 and Hilal-i-Imtiaz (Military).

In December 2016, Ghafoor was appointed as the Director-General of the ISPR.

In January 2020, Ghafoor was appointed as the General Officer Commanding 40 Division in Okara. On 25 November 2020, he was promoted to the rank of Lieutenant General and appointed as Inspector General Communications and Information Technology and now serving as Quetta Corps Commander.

Commands held
 21 Artillery Division, Swat (Now at Pannu Aqil)
 January 2016 - December 2016 
Preceded By: Maj Gen  
Succeeded By: Maj Gen (Now Lt Gen) Ali Aamir Awan
 Director-General Inter-Services Public Relations
 December 2016 - January 2020 
Preceded By: Lt Gen Asim Bajwa 
Succeeded By: Maj Gen (Lt Gen) Babar Iftikhar
 40 Infantry Division, Okara
 January 2020 - December 2020 
Preceded By: Maj Gen Azhar Waqas 
Succeeded By: Maj Gen Asad Ur Rehman
 Inspector General Communication and Information Technology
 December 2020 - August 2022 
Preceded By: Lt Gen Ali Aamir Awan 
Succeeded By: -
 Commander XII Corps, Quetta 
 August 2022 – present 
Preceded By: Lt Gen Sarfaraz Ali  
Succeeded By: -

Awards and decorations

References

|-
 

Living people
Pakistani generals
Directors-General of the Inter-Services Public Relations
Recipients of Hilal-i-Imtiaz
Graduates of the Staff College, Quetta
National Defence University, Pakistan alumni
Pakistani expatriates in Indonesia
1971 births